The Eureka Quartzite is an extensive Paleozoic marine sandstone deposit in western North America that is notable for its great extent, extreme purity, consistently fine grain size of Quartzite, and its tendency to form conspicuous white cliffs visible from afar.

The Eureka is commonly underlain and overlain by contrasting slope-forming limestone and dolomite strata, all of Ordovician age. It was named in 1883 for the Eureka mineral district in Nevada, and that name is used almost exclusively in Nevada, but, in ensuing years, as extensions of the deposit were discovered in other areas, the same formation was given many other local names.

Description

Extent 
In Canada the east-west extent is much less but there also, it thins out to both east and west.

Composition 
Cliff-forming quartzite, the principle part of the Eureka, is composed of more than 99 percent quartz, which includes both the sand grains and the cement that binds them. The quartz cement accounts for its outstanding hardness and resistance to erosion. Minor constituents are grains of zircon and tourmaline and a trace of feldspar. All of the constituents in Nevada and Utah are less than 1 mm (0.039 in) in diameter; those in Canada are slightly larger. Bioturbation is believed to account for the scarcity of internal bedding.

Origin 
Almost all of the constituent grains of the formation were deposited in a near-shore environment, mainly in shallow water, and to a much lesser extent on the beach as determined by the nature of bedding from place to place. The surfaces of the quartz grains are almost universally "frosted" or abraded, indicating that they, at one time or another, occupied a subaerial environment.  Almost all of the constituent grains were determined to have originated in Canada, and were carried southward by currents along the eastern shore of the Paleozoic sea. This concept is supported by several lines of evidence: (1) the only plausible source of such a large volume of sand is in Canada at about 56° north latitude where Cambrian sandstone was exposed extensively in Ordovician time; (2) the base of the formation decreases in age from north to south as determined by marine fossils in subjacent beds; (3) the formation becomes finer grained from north to south apparently due to progressive abrasion of the grains along the way; and (4) the radiometric age of constituent zircon grains points to a northern source.

See also 

 List of fossiliferous stratigraphic units in Nevada
 List of fossiliferous stratigraphic units in California

References 

Geologic formations of Alberta
Geologic formations of British Columbia
Geologic formations of California
Geologic formations of Idaho
Geologic formations of Nevada
Geologic formations of Utah
Ordovician System of North America
Ordovician Alberta
Ordovician British Columbia
Ordovician California
Ordovician Idaho
Ordovician geology of Nevada
Ordovician geology of Utah
Ordovician southern paleotropical deposits
Quartzite formations
Shallow marine deposits